The 2019 NC State Wolfpack baseball team represented North Carolina State University during the 2019 NCAA Division I baseball season. The Wolfpack played their home games at Doak Field as a member of the Atlantic Coast Conference. They were led by head coach Elliott Avent, his 23rd season at NC State. The Wolfpack finished the season 2nd in the ACC's Atlantic Division with a record of 42–19, 18–12 in conference play.

Previous season
In 2018, the Wolfpack finished the season 2nd in the ACC's Atlantic Division with a record of 42–18, 19–11 in conference play. They qualified for the 2018 Atlantic Coast Conference baseball tournament, and were eliminated in pool play.

Personnel

Roster

Coaching staff

Source:

Schedule

! style="background:#CC0000;color:white;"| Regular Season
|- valign="top" 

|- align="center" bgcolor="#bbffbb"
| February 15 || * || 22 || Doak Field • Raleigh, NC || W 8–2 || Parker (1–0) || Gottesman (0–1) || None || 2,763 || 1–0 || –
|- align="center" bgcolor="#bbffbb"
| February 16 || Bucknell* || 22 || Doak Field • Raleigh, NC || W 14–2 || Barger (1–0) || Grabek (0–1) || None || 2,306 || 2–0 || –
|- align="center" bgcolor="#bbffbb"
| February 17 || Bucknell* || 22 || Doak Field • Raleigh, NC || W 12–8 || Klyman (1–0) || Wincig (0–1) || Feeney (1) || 2,315 || 3–0 || –
|- align="center" bgcolor="#bbffbb"
| February 19 || at * || 22 || Latham Park • Elon, NC || W 5–0 || Justice (1–0) || Wetherbee (0–1) || None || 244 || 4–0 || –
|- align="center" bgcolor="#bbffbb"
| February 22 || vs * || 22 || TicketReturn.com Field • Myrtle Beach, SC || W 3–2 (11) || Klyman (2–0) || Schultz (0–1) || None || 175 || 5–0 || –
|- align="center" bgcolor="#bbffbb"
| February 23 || vs * || 22 || Springs Brooks Stadium • Conway, SC || W 5–0 || Johnston (1–0) || Tyranski (0–1) || None || 409 || 6–0 || –
|- align="center" bgcolor="#bbffbb"
| February 24 || at No. 10 Coastal Carolina* || 22 ||  Springs Brooks Stadium • Conway, SC || W 7–6 || Klyman (3–0) || Kobos (1–1) || None || 2,277 || 7–0 || –
|- align="center" bgcolor="#bbffbb"
| February 27 || at *  || 10 || Jim Perry Stadium • Buies Creek, NC || W 10–1 || Johnston (2–0) || Johnson (0–1) || None || 1,286 || 8–0 || –
|-

|- align="center" bgcolor="#bbffbb"
| March 1 || * || 10 || Doak Field • Raleigh, NC || W 3–2 || Parker (2–0) || Fredrickson (0–1) || Feeney (2) || 2,018 || 9–0 || –
|- align="center" bgcolor="#bbffbb"
| March 2 || Minnesota* || 10 || Doak Field • Raleigh, NC || W 8–4 || Silver (1–0) || Thoresen (0–3) || None || 3,048 || 10–0 || –
|- align="center" bgcolor="#bbffbb"
| March 3 || Minnesota* || 10 || Doak Field • Raleigh, NC || W 5–4 || Bienlien (1–0) || Burchill (0–1) || None || 2,284 || 11–0 || –
|- align="center" bgcolor="#bbffbb"
| March 6 || at * || 5 || Durham Athletic Park  • Durham, NC ||  || Klyman (4–0) || Guglielmello (0–3) || None || 228 || 12–0 || –
|- align="center" bgcolor="#bbffbb"
| March 8 ||  || 5 || Doak Field • Raleigh, NC || W 4–3 || Bienlien (2–0) || Moore (1–1) || Klyman (1) || 2,167 || 13–0 || 1–0
|- align="center" bgcolor="#bbffbb"
| March 9 || Pittsburgh || 5 || Doak Field • Raleigh, NC || W 21–3 || Blake (1–0) || Hammer (2–1) || None || 2,392 || 14–0 || 2–0
|- align="center" bgcolor="#bbffbb"
| March 10 || Pittsburgh || 5 || Doak Field • Raleigh, NC || W 6–5 || Swiney (1–0) || Moore (1–2) || Feeney (3) || 2,558 || 15–0 || 3–0
|- align="center" bgcolor="#bbffbb"
| March 12 || at * || 2 || BB&T Ballpark • Charlotte, NC || W 6–5 || Klyman (5–0) || Herbert (0–1) || Feeney (4) || 4,324 || 16–0 || 3–0
|- align="center" bgcolor="#bbffbb"
| March 13 || * || 2 || Doak Field • Raleigh, NC || W 18–3 || Cotter (1–0) || Halligan (1–1) || None || 2,234 || 17–0 || 3–0
|- align="center" bgcolor="#bbffbb"
| March 15 || No. 1 Florida State || 2 || Doak Field • Raleigh, NC || W 16–0 || Parker (3–0) || Parrish (2–1) || None || 2,662 || 18–0 || 4–0
|- align="center" bgcolor="#bbffbb"
| March 16 || No. 1 Florida State || 2 || Doak Field • Raleigh, NC || W 9–8 || Feeney (1–0)  || Grady (2–1) || None || 3,048 || 19–0 || 5–0
|- align="center" bgcolor="#ffbbbb"
| March 17 || No. 1 Florida State || 2 || Doak Field • Raleigh, NC || L 5–7 || Drohan (2–0) || Bienlien (2–1) || Flowers (3) || 3,048 || 19–1 || 5–1
|- align="center" bgcolor="#bbffbb"
| March 19 || * || 1 || Doak Field • Raleigh, NC || W 11–1 || Clenney (1–0) || Watters (0–2) || None || 2,470 || 20–1 || 5–1
|- align="center" bgcolor="#bbffbb"
| March 22 || at No. 29 Miami (FL) || 1 || Alex Rodriguez Park at Mark Light Field • Coral Gables, FL || W 6–3 || Nelson (1–0) || McKendry (4–1) || Feeney (5) || 2,729 || 21–1 || 6–1
|- align="center" bgcolor="#bbffbb"
| March 23 || at No. 29 Miami (FL) || 1 || Alex Rodriguez Park at Mark Light Field • Coral Gables, FL || W 7–6 || Johnston (3–0) || McMahon (1–2) || Feeney (6) || 2,868 || 22–1 || 7–1
|- align="center" bgcolor="#bbffbb"
| March 24 || at No. 29 Miami (FL) || 1 || Alex Rodriguez Park at Mark Light Field • Coral Gables, FL || W 6–4 || Bienlien (3–1) || Federman (0–2) || None || 2,589 || 23–1 || 8–1
|- align="center" bgcolor="#bbffbb"
| March 26 || Elon* || 1 || Doak Field • Raleigh, NC || W 21–2 || Barger (2–0) || Daniels (2–1) || Gauthier (1) || 2,634 || 24–1 || 8–1
|- align="center" bgcolor="#bbffbb"
| March 27 || at * || 1 || First National Bank Field • Greensboro, NC || W 12–3 || Cotter (2–0) || Foster (1–2) || None || 1,049 || 25–1 || 8–1
|- align="center" bgcolor="#ffbbbb"
| March 29 || Virginia || 1 || Doak Field • Raleigh, NC || L 3–4 || Abbott (2–1) || Parker (3–1) || Whitten (4) || 3,048 || 25–2 || 8–2
|- align="center" bgcolor="#bbffbb"
| March 30 || Virginia || 1 || Doak Field • Raleigh, NC || W 3–0 || Johnston (4–0) || Murdock (1–2) || None || 3,048 || 26–2 || 9–2
|- align="center" bgcolor="#bbffbb"
| March 31 || Virginia || 1 || Doak Field • Raleigh, NC || W 8–7 || Swiney (2–0) || Harrington (1–1) || Cotter (1) || 3,048 || 27–2 || 10–2
|-

|- align="center" bgcolor="#ffbbbb"
| April 2 || vs South Carolina* || 1 || BB&T Ballpark • Charlotte, NC || L 8–10 || Sweatt (2–2) || Cotter (2–1) || None || 4,090 || 27–3 || 10–2
|- align="center" bgcolor="#bbffbb"
| April 5 || at  || 1 || Harrington Athletics Village • Chestnut Hill, MA || W 6–5 || Justice (2–0) || Walsh (0–3) || Silver (1) || 240 || 28–3 || 11–2
|- align="center" bgcolor="#bbffbb"
| April 6 || at Boston College || 1 || Harrington Athletics Village • Chestnut Hill, MA || W 16–4 || Johnston (5–0) || Mancini (2–5) || None || 563 || 29–3 || 12–2
|- align="center" bgcolor="#ffbbbb"
| April 7 || at Boston College || 1 || Harrington Athletics Village • Chestnut Hill, MA || L 1–3 || Lane (2–1) || Cotter (2–2) || None || 525 || 29–4 || 12–3
|- align="center" bgcolor="#ffbbbb"
| April 11 || Coastal Carolina* || 2 || Doak Field • Raleigh, NC || L 6–7  || Damron (2–0) || Klyman (5–1) || Eardensohn (1) || 3,048 || 29–5 || 12–3
|- align="center" bgcolor="#ffbbbb"
| April 13 || No. 20 Louisville || 2 || Doak Field • Raleigh, NC || L 10–14  || Detmers (6–2) || Parkers (3–2) || McAvene (4) || 2,695 || 29–6 || 12–4
|- align="center" bgcolor="#ffbbbb"
| April 13 || No. 20 Louisville || 2 || Doak Field • Raleigh, NC || L 2–14  || Bennett (5–2) || Johnston (5–1) || Perkins (1) || 2,695 || 29–7 || 12–5
|- align="center" bgcolor="#ffbbbb"
| April 14 || No. 20 Louisville || 2 || Doak Field • Raleigh, NC || L 3–6  || Miller (2–0) || Silver (1–1) || None || 2,822 || 29–8 || 12–6
|- align="center" bgcolor="#bbffbb"
| April 16 || at * || 11 || Brooks Field • Wilmington, NC || W 14–7 || Cotter (3–2) || Herring (0–5) || None || 2,548 || 30–8 || 12–6
|- align="center" bgcolor="#ffbbbb"
| April 18 || at  || 11 || David F. Couch Ballpark • Winston-Salem, NC || L 3–7 || Peluse (3–5) || Feeney (1–1) || None || 1,534 || 30–9 || 12–7
|- align="center" bgcolor="#bbffbb"
| April 20 || at Wake Forest || 11 || David F. Couch Ballpark • Winston-Salem, NC || W 4–3 || Swiney (3–0) || Shuster (4–2) || None || 1,707 || 31–9 || 13–7
|- align="center" bgcolor="#ffbbbb"
| April 20 || at Wake Forest || 11 || David F. Couch Ballpark • Winston-Salem, NC || L 8–9 || Witt (1–1) || Cotter (3–3) || Fleming (6) || 1,707 || 31–10 || 13–8
|- align="center" bgcolor="#bbffbb"
| April 23 || * || 14 || Doak Field • Raleigh, NC || W 10–6 || Swiney (4–0) || Cole (2–4) || None || 2,669 || 32–10 || 13–8
|- align="center" bgcolor="#ffbbbb"
| April 26 || at  || 14 || Frank Eck Stadium • South Bend, IN || L 4–5 || Belcik (1–3) || Harrison (0–1) || Vail (4) || 450 || 32–11 || 13–9
|- align="center" bgcolor="#bbffbb"
| April 27 || at Notre Dame || 14 || Frank Eck Stadium • South Bend, IN || W 4–2 || Justice (3–0) || Junker (2–2) || Swiney (1) || 150 || 33–11 || 14–9
|- align="center" bgcolor="#ffbbbb"
| April 28 || at Notre Dame || 14 || Frank Eck Stadium • South Bend, IN || L 1–4 || Brown (3–5) || Silver (1–2) || Vail (5) || 250 || 33–12 || 14–10
|- align="center" bgcolor="#bbffbb"
| April 30 || UNC–Wilmington* || 20 || Doak Field • Raleigh, NC || W 11–3 || Cotter (4–3) || Haire (0–1) || None || 2,870 || 34–12 || 14–10
|-

|- align="center" bgcolor="#bbffbb"
| May 3 || *  || 20 || Doak Field • Raleigh, NC || W 6–3 || Parker (4–2) || Ridgely (3–3) || Klyman (2) || 2,784 || 35–12 || 14–10
|- align="center" bgcolor="#bbffbb"
| May 4 || Radford* || 20 || Doak Field • Raleigh, NC || W 9–3 || Justice (4–0) || Nardi (3–3) || Cotter (2) || 2,776 || 36–12 || 14–10
|- align="center" bgcolor="#bbffbb"
| May 5 || Radford* || 20 || Doak Field • Raleigh, NC || W 6–3 || Swiney (5–0) || Gerber (1–2) || Feeney (7) || 2,414 || 37–12 || 14–10
|- align="center" bgcolor="#ffbbbb"
| May 7 || Campbell* || 20 || Doak Field • Raleigh, NC || L 3–5 || Westlake (3–2) || Barger (2–1) || Messer (3) || 2,613 || 37–13 || 14–10
|- align="center" bgcolor="#bbffbb"
| May 10 || Clemson || 20 || Doak Field • Raleigh, NC || W 6–1 || Swiney (6–0) || Clark (7–2) || None || 3,048 || 38–13 || 15–10
|- align="center" bgcolor="#ffbbbb"
| May 11 || Clemson || 20 || Doak Field • Raleigh, NC ||  || Spiers (2–4) || Klyman (5–2) || None || 2,929 || 38–14 || 15–11
|- align="center" bgcolor="#bbffbb"
| May 12 || Clemson || 20 || Doak Field • Raleigh, NC || W 8–3 || Cotter (5–3) || Jones (2–1) || None || 2,704 || 39–14 || 16–11
|- align="center" bgcolor="#ffbbbb"
| May 16 || at No. 13 North Carolina || 25 || Boshamer Stadium • Chapel Hill, NC || L 3–5 || Butler (2–0) || Swiney (6–1) || Lancellotti (2) || 3,162 || 39–15 || 16–11
|- align="center" bgcolor="#bbffbb"
| May 17 || at No. 13 North Carolina || 25 || Boshamer Stadium • Chapel Hill, NC || W 11–2 || Johnston (6–1) || Bergner (5–1) || None || 3,829 || 40–15 || 17–11
|- align="center" bgcolor="#bbffbb"
| May 18 || at No. 13 North Carolina || 25 || Boshamer Stadium • Chapel Hill, NC || W 11–0 || Swiney (7–1) || Sandy (2–2) || None || 3,837 || 41–15 || 18–11
|-

|- 
! style="background:#CC0000;color:white;"| Post-Season
|-

|- align="center" bgcolor="#bbffbb"
| May 23 || vs (10) Wake Forest ||  || Durham Bulls Athletic Park • Durham, NC || W 6–5 || Nelson (2–0) || Fleming (1–4) || Cotter (3) || 4,318 || 42–15 || 1–0 
|- align="center" bgcolor="#ffbbbb"
| May 24 || vs No. 19 (6) Florida State || 14 (3) || Durham Bulls Athletic Park • Durham, NC ||  || Van Eyk (9–3) || Barger (2–2) || None || 5,419 || 42–16 || 1–1 
|- align="center" bgcolor="#ffbbbb"
| May 25 || vs No. 6 (2)  || 14 (3) || Durham Bulls Athletic Park • Durham, NC || L 2–9 || Hughes (8–2) || Parker (4–3) || None || 5,846 || 42–17 || 1–2
|-

|- align="center" bgcolor="#ffbbbb"
| May 31 || (3) Campbell ||  || Lewis Field at Clark–LeClair Stadium • Greenville, NC || L 4–5 || Horrell (10–3) || Johnston (6–2) || Moore (5) || 4,239 || 42–18 || 0–1
|- align="center" bgcolor="#ffbbbb"
| June 2 || (1) No. 10 East Carolina ||  || Lewis Field at Clark–LeClair Stadium • Greenville, NC || L 2–9 || Agnos (11–2) || Parker (4–4) || None || 4,670 || 42–19 || 0–2
|-

|- 
| style="font-size:88%"|All rankings from Collegiate Baseball.

Source:

Greenville Regional

Ranking movements

2019 MLB draft

References

NC State Wolfpack
NC State Wolfpack baseball seasons
NC State Wolfpack
NC State